Dianthus carthusianorum, commonly known as Carthusian pink, is a species of Dianthus, native to Europe, from Spain north to Belgium and Poland, and east to Ukraine, occurring in dry, grassy habitats at elevations of up to  in mountains.

Gallery

References

carthusianorum
Plants described in 1753
Taxa named by Carl Linnaeus